PNS Tughril may refer to following ships of the Pakistan Navy:

 , the former British O-class destroyer HMS Onslaught (G04) acquired by Pakistan in 1951 and scrapped in 1977.
 , the former United States  USS Henderson (DD-785) acquired by the Pakistan Navy in 1980 and renamed. She was transferred to the Pakistan Maritime Security Agency in 1988 and renamed Nazim. She was decommissioned in 2001.

References

Pakistan Navy ship names